Starstruck may refer to:

Television
 Starstruck, a 1981 ABC Afterschool Special
 StarStruck (2000 TV series), an Australian talent show
 StarStruck (Philippine TV series), a 2003 reality talent competition show
 StarStruck (2005 TV series), an Australian talent show based on the British show Stars in Their Eyes
 Starstruck (2021 TV series), a British sitcom
 Starstruck (2022 TV series), a British reformatted version of Stars in Their Eyes
 "Starstruck" (Star Trek: Prodigy), a 2021 episode
 "Star Struck" (Law & Order), a 1992 episode

Film
 Starstruck (1982 film), an Australian musical comedy
 Star Struck, a 1994 television film starring Chelsea Noble
 Starstruck, a 1995 film featuring Karen Black
 Starstruck (1998 film), a film starring Jamie Kennedy 
 Starstruck (2010 film), a Disney Channel Original Movie

Literature and theatre
 Starstruck (play), a 1980 play by Elaine Lee
 Starstruck (comics), a comic-book series based on the play
 Starstruck, a 1996 novel by Richie Tankersley Cusick
 Starstruck, a 1998 play by Roy Williams
 Starstruck, a 2005 Truth, Dare, Kiss or Promise novel by Cathy Hopkins
 Starstruck, a 2013 novel by Brenda Hiatt
 Star Struck, a 2005 novel by Pamela Anderson

Songs
 "Starstruck" (Kinks song), 1968
 "Starstruck" (Years & Years song), 2021
 "Starstruck", by Rainbow from Rising, 1976
 "Starstruck", by Jeffree Star, 2008
 "Starstruck", by Lady Gaga from The Fame, 2008
 "Starstruck", by Robbie Williams from Reality Killed the Video Star, 2009
 "Starstruck", by Sterling Knight from the soundtrack of the 2010 film of the same name
 "Starstruck", by Sorry from 925, 2020
 "Starstrukk", by 3OH!3 and Katy Perry, 2009

Other uses
 Starstruck (company), who attempted low-cost orbital sea-launched hybrid rocket launches
 Starstruck, the winning demo at the 2006 Assembly demo party
 Starstruck Entertainment, a management company founded by Reba McEntire